The 1933 Dayton Flyers football team was an American football team that represented the University of Dayton as a member of the Ohio Athletic Conference during the 1933 college football season. In its 11th season under head coach Harry Baujan, the team compiled a 7–2–1 record.

Schedule

References

Dayton
Dayton Flyers football seasons
Dayton Flyers football